Philip John Murphy (born September 26, 1957) is a former American football defensive tackle in the National Football League. He was drafted by the Los Angeles Rams in the 3rd round of the 1980 NFL Draft. Murphy played college football at South Carolina State.

References

Los Angeles Rams players
South Carolina State Bulldogs football players
American football defensive tackles
Players of American football from Connecticut
Sportspeople from New London, Connecticut
1957 births
Living people